Orry-la-Ville-Coye is a railway station serving Orry-la-Ville and Coye-la-Forêt to the North of Paris, France. It is situated on the Paris–Lille railway. The station is composed of a station building and four tracks served by two lateral platforms as well as a central platform.

The station's services are:

RER D towards Paris and Creil
Main lines (TER Hauts-de-France) towards Paris and Amiens

Due to the station being located outside Île-de-France, IdF's monthly and yearly rail pass, the carte orange, cannot be used and so standard SNCF ticketing is used.

References

Railway stations in Oise
Railway stations in France opened in 1859